Peter Warren Singer (born 1974) is an American political scientist, an international relations scholar and a specialist on 21st century warfare. He is a New York Times bestselling author of both nonfiction and fiction, who has been described in the Wall Street Journal as “the premier futurist in the national-security environment."

Career
He is currently Strategist for the New America Foundation, a Professor of Practice at Arizona State University, and a founder of Useful Fiction LLC. He has also received the title of a "mad scientist" for the US Army's Training and Doctrine Command. Singer previously worked at the Harvard University Belfer Center, the Office of the Secretary of Defense, and was Senior Fellow at the Brookings Institution, where he was Director of the Center for 21st Century Security and Intelligence. Singer also served as coordinator of the Defense Policy Task Force for Barack Obama's 2008 presidential campaign as well as contributing editor for Popular Science.   
 
Singer has been named to the "Top 100 Global Thinkers" list by Foreign Policy. Defense News named him one of the 100 most influential people on defense issues. He also served on the advisory group for Joint Forces Command, helping the U.S. military visualize and plan for the future. In 2015, he was named by Onalytica analysis as one of the ten most influential voices on cybersecurity. In addition to his work on conflict issues, Singer was a member of the State Department's Advisory Committee on International Communications and Information Policy.

Singer has provided commentary on technology and military affairs for many of the major TV and radio outlets, including ABC News Nightline, Al Jazeera, BBC, CBS-60 Minutes, CNN, Fox, NPR, The Daily Show, and the NBC Today Show. He is also a founder and organizer of the U.S.–Islamic World Forum, a global conference that brings together leaders from across the United States and the Muslim world, and the Cyber Citizenship initiative, which seeks to build skills among K-12 students to have greater resilience from online threats of misinformation and disinformation. Singer has also worked with a variety of entertainment world projects for Warner Brothers, DreamWorks, and Universal, including the movies Traitor, and Whistleblower, the TV series Strike Back and Curiosity, as well as the 24: Redemption movie/DVD. Singer served as consultant on the bestselling Activision video game series Call of Duty.

Books

Corporate Warriors
His first book Corporate Warriors: The Rise of the Privatized Military Industry (Cornell University Press, 2003) was the first to explore the new industry of private companies providing military services for hire, an issue that soon became important with the use and abuse of these companies in Iraq. The book was named best book of the year by the American Political Science Association, among the top five international affairs books of the year by the Gelber Prize, and a "top ten summer read" by Businessweek.

Children at War
Singer's next book, Children at War (Pantheon, 2005), explored the rise of another new force in modern warfare, child soldier groups. The book was one of the winners of the 2006 Robert F. Kennedy Memorial Book of the Year Award.

Wired for War

Wired for War: The Robotics Revolution and Conflict in the 21st Century (Penguin, 2009) is a best-selling book by P. W. Singer. It explores how science fiction has started to play out on modern day battlefields, with robots used more and more in war. Singer's 2009 book tour included stops on NPR's Fresh Air, the Daily Show with Jon Stewart, the opening of the TED conference, the Royal Court of the United Arab Emirates and presentations at 75 venues around the United States.

Cybersecurity and Cyberwar: What Everyone Needs to Know
Cybersecurity and Cyberwar: What Everyone Needs to Know (Oxford University Press, 2014) is a book by P. W. Singer and Allan Friedman. The book explores how the Internet and cybersecurity works, why it matters, and what can be done. It was featured on Charlie Rose, NPR's Fresh Air, CNBC Squawkbox, the SXSW conference, and named to the official reading lists for the U.S. Army, U.S. Air Force and U.S. Navy.

Ghost Fleet: A Novel of the Next World War

Ghost Fleet: A Novel of the Next World War (Eamon Dolan/Houghton Mifflin Harcourt, 2015) is Singer's first novel, co-written with August Cole. The book created the concept of FICINT, short for "Fictional Intelligence."  FICINT has been defined by the authors as "a hybrid of narrative and research analysis, designed both to entertain and educate." Using the format of a novel, Ghost Fleet melded nonfiction style research on emerging trends and technology with a fictional exploration of what war at sea, on land, in the air, space, and cyberspace will be like in the future. Publishers Weekly described it: "Tom Clancy fans will relish Singer and Cole's first novel, a chilling vision of what might happen in a world war." The book was subsequently placed on the reading list of organizations ranging from all the US military services to the CIA and Royal Air Force. The US Navy also later named a robotic ship program "Ghost Fleet."

LikeWar: The Weaponization of Social Media 
LikeWar: The Weaponization of Social Media (Eamon Dolan/Houghton Mifflin Harcourt, 2018) is a book by P. W. Singer and Emerson T. Brooking. The book examines the history of communications, the rise of open-source intelligence, the failed promise of cyber-utopianism, the advent of internet-based information warfare, and the growing political influence of Silicon Valley. Singer and Brooking identify a new mode of conflict, "LikeWar", in which competing viral phenomena influence the outcome of both military operations and political campaigns. Singer has described "cyberwar" as hacking computer networks and "likewar" as hacking people on them, "where the object is to drive something viral through a mix of likes, shares, and sometimes lies."  In a starred review, Booklist described it as, "required reading for everyone living in a democracy and all who aspire to," while Amazon and Foreign Affairs named it a book of the year.

Burn-In: A Novel of the Real Robotic Revolution 
Burn-In: A Novel of the Real Robotic Revolution (Houghton Mifflin Harcourt, 2020) is the second novel of "useful fiction" by Singer and August Cole. It used the format of a technothriller to share 300 nonfiction insights about the trends of AI and automation and their political, economic, and social effects.

On December 15, 2020, it was announced that a drama based on the novel was in development by CBS with Rideback as the production company and Robert Doherty, Daniel Lin, Lindsey Liberatore, P.W. Singer, and August Cole as executive producers.

See also
The Brookings Institution
Military use of children

Notes

External links

 P.W. Singer Author website
 
 Curriculum vitae
 Brookings Institution
 Wired for War book website
 Video (with audio-only available) of conversation with Singer and John Horgan on Bloggingheads.tv
 Interview with Peter Singer on Child Soldiers, Private Soldiers and Robots by Theory Talks
 Interview on Wired for War at the Pritzker Military Museum & Library
 Audio: Peter Singer in conversation on the BBC World Service discussion programme The Forum
 

American political scientists
International relations scholars
American military writers
Harvard University alumni
Living people
1974 births
Year of birth uncertain
Princeton School of Public and International Affairs alumni
Brookings Institution people